Vanessa Blue (born May 27, 1974) is an American pornographic actress, producer, online model, and director. She was inducted into the AVN Hall of Fame in 2013.

Career
Blue initially worked as a nude dancer and studied to be an emergency medical technician. During her dancing career, she met a fellow dancer who introduced her to fetish modeling. After that, at the suggestion of a different model, she started performing in porn movies. Her first appearance was in a film with Ed Powers. After a year, she took a three-year break, moving to Nebraska to be with her family, but came back to the industry in 2000.

She worked for Mercenary Pictures for several years and directed several of their series, one of which, Black Reign, won the 2005 AVN Award for Best Ethnic-Themed Series. She was engaged to Mercenary's owner, Lexington Steele. In 2008, Steele and Blue filed federal lawsuits against each other over the ownership of numerous videos that first appeared under the Mercenary Pictures label. The suits were settled in March 2009 after meeting with an alternative dispute resolution jurist. She subsequently distributed her movies through Justin Slayer International, signing with them in April 2010.

Blue starred on Playboy TV and hosted Private Calls and Night Calls on Playboy Radio until 2008.

She briefly returned to doing scenes in 2011, and  did a series of hardcore scenes for Brazzers.

Director
Blue has also directed femdom genre of movies under the pseudonym Domina X, and has also been a contract director for DVSX and Adam & Eve.

Awards
In 2008, Blue won an Urban X Award for Videography and was admitted to the Urban X Hall of Fame in 2009.
In 2013 she was inducted into the AVN Hall of Fame.

References

External links

 
 
 
 

Living people
African-American pornographic film actors
American female adult models
American pornographic film actresses
American pornographic film directors
Women pornographic film directors
Actresses from Long Beach, California
Pornographic film actors from California
Film directors from California
BDSM people
1974 births
21st-century African-American people
21st-century African-American women
20th-century African-American people
20th-century African-American women
Vanessa Blue xxx